Puketutu was a flag station on the North Island Main Trunk line, in the Waitomo District of New Zealand.

Initial doubt about the route of the line to the south was resolved by a survey in 1884. It was then said that the bush might provide timber traffic for the railway for 50 years, until it was all converted to farm land. Works were advanced enough for a ministerial party to ride the route to the south on horseback by 1890. Most of the construction was done by cooperatives.

The Public Works Department had contracted the Te Kuiti to Mokau Station section on 9 March 1887 and it opened just over 2 years later. Construction began on the section southward to Poro-O-Tarao tunnel in September 1892. However, for twelve years, from 1889 until the line to Poro-O-Tarao opened on 1 April 1901, Puketutu was the terminus of the line, though, from 18 January 1897, a weekly goods train ran to Poro-O-Tarao. The delay was partly due to poor access and rugged country, but 2 years of the delay were due to economic recession, little work being done from 1890 to 1892. 

The name was changed from Mokau to Puketutu on 11 May 1903.

Lack of fencing to the south was an issue when the line opened, with many cattle killed and trains delayed. Although plans for fencing were made in 1885, before the land was bought, it wasn't until 1907 that fencing started and 1909 before it was finished.

A  branch line down the Mokau valley to Piopio and Aria was surveyed, but rejected in a ballot (under the 1914 Local Railways Act) in 1922. A  extension south to a coal seam at Waitewhena was also considered. From 1933 that mine was served via Ohura on the Stratford–Okahukura Line.

A cattle yard was added in 1924. A railway house was added in 1938.

The line approaching the station was eased when it was electrified.

References

External links 
 Blue Streak train at Puketutu about 1970

Railway stations in New Zealand
Waitomo District
Rail transport in Waikato
Buildings and structures in Waikato
Railway stations opened in 1889
Railway stations closed in 1977